John Overton may refer to:

People
John Overton (printseller) (1640–1713), seller of prints and maps who succeeded Peter Stent
John Overton (priest) (1763–1838), English clergyman
John Overton (judge) (1766–1833), judge at the Superior Court of Tennessee
John Henry Overton (1835–1903), English cleric and church historian
John H. Overton (1875–1948), United States Senator
John Overton (footballer) (born 1956), English football (soccer) player
John W. Overton (1894–1918), athlete and United States Marine KIA in World War I

Other uses
John Overton High School, Nashville, Tennessee